Municipal Okrug 65 is a municipal okrug in Primorsky District, one of the eighty-one low-level municipal divisions  of the federal city of St. Petersburg, Russia. As of the 2010 Census, its population was 127,473, up from 83,952 recorded during the 2002 Census.

References

Notes

Sources

Primorsky District, Saint Petersburg